The  West Virginia lunar sample displays are two commemorative plaques consisting of small fragments of Moon specimen brought back with the Apollo 11 and Apollo 17 lunar missions and given in the 1970s to the people of the state of West Virginia by United States President Richard Nixon as goodwill gifts.

Description

Apollo 11

Apollo 17

History 

The West Virginia Apollo 17 "goodwill Moon rocks" plaque display was presented to the people of the state of West Virginia in 1973 but went missing. In June 2010 a graduate student of Joseph Gutheinz, former special agent with NASA and self-appointed investigator of missing "Moon rocks" displays, tracked the West Virginia Apollo 17 lunar sample display to the home of a retired dentist, Robert Conner, in Morgantown, West Virginia. Conner had acquired the display from his late brother.

Conner speculated that the West Virginia Apollo 17 "goodwill Moon rocks" plaque display was received by his late brother, Troy Blaine Conner, Jr. of Moundsville, West Virginia. Conner believes the Apollo 17 lunar sample plaque came by way of former Governor Arch A. Moore Jr. through his connection with Troy's Washington law firm. Moore said he "might have given it to Troy 'to observe'."

Conner pointed out that the plaque was so plain and obscure sitting on a shelf at his home that he put no value on it. He didn't realize that the state of West Virginia was looking for it. As of 2012, the state had both the Apollo 11 and Apollo 17 lunar plaque displays.

See also
 List of Apollo lunar sample displays

References

Further reading 
 

Tourist attractions in West Virginia